Yaroslav Rostislavovich Chupris (born 12 September 1981) is a Belarusian former professional ice hockey winger. He participated at the 2010 IIHF World Championship with the Belarusan national team.

References

External links
 

1981 births
Living people
Belarusian ice hockey left wingers
HC Dinamo Minsk players
HC Shakhtyor Soligorsk players
Keramin Minsk players
Salavat Yulaev Ufa players
Ice hockey people from Minsk
Yunost Minsk players